Commotion may refer to:

 Commotion (animation) - an animation and visual effects application
 Commotion (horse) - a thoroughbred racehorse
 Commotion Wireless - an open-source wireless mesh network
 "Commotion" (song), a song by Creedence Clearwater Revival on the 1969 album Green River